Numara Software was a software company based in Tampa, Florida which made IT service and asset management software, targeted at network management and business process managers.

Products 
The Numara Software products Numara Track-It! and Numara FootPrints are focused on service desk markets for small and medium sized businesses. Numara FootPrints is awarded PinkVERIFY ITIL certification by Pink Elephant for 10 processes.

Company 
Founded in 1991 as Blue Ocean Software, the company was acquired by Intuit in September 2002. The company continued to operate autonomously but as a wholly owned subsidiary under the Intuit umbrella, known as Intuit IT Solutions.

In December 2005, the company was renamed "Numara Software" when TA Associates purchased it from Intuit. The genesis of the new company name comes from the combination of the word "Nu," an English phonetic equivalent of "new" and "Mara" which in many languages means "Ocean." TA Associates has offices in Boston, Menlo Park and London and manages over $6 billion in capital.

In September 2006, Numara Software acquired UniPress Software, the makers of Gosling Emacs and "FootPrints." In September 2009, Numara Software released the Numara Asset Management Platform to the market.

On January 30, 2012, Numara Software entered into a definitive agreement to be acquired by BMC Software.

References 

Software companies based in Florida
Companies based in Tampa, Florida
1991 establishments in Florida
Software companies established in 1991
2012 mergers and acquisitions
Software companies of the United States